Gina Torres (born April 25, 1969) is an American actress. She is known for her starring roles as Zoe Washburne in the science fiction series Firefly (2002–2003) and its feature film sequel Serenity (2005), and as Jessica Pearson in the USA Network legal drama series Suits (2011–2018) and its spin-off series Pearson (2019).

Torres appeared in the science fiction films The Matrix Reloaded and The Matrix Revolutions (both 2003), the drama film Jam (2006), the romantic comedy film I Think I Love My Wife (2007), the independent drama film South of Pico (2007), and the drama film Selah and the Spades (2019).

Throughout her acting career, Torres has appeared in supporting roles in numerous television series, including Hercules: The Legendary Journeys, Xena: Warrior Princess, Cleopatra 2525, Alias, Angel, 24, The Shield, Gossip Girl, The Vampire Diaries, Hannibal, 9-1-1: Lone Star, Revenge, and Westworld.

Early life
Torres was born in New York and grew up in The Bronx. Her parents were natives of Cuba, and her father worked as a typesetter for La Prensa and the New York Daily News. Torres speaks fluent Spanish.

Torres, a mezzo-soprano, began singing at an early age and attended Fiorello H. LaGuardia High School of Music & Art and Performing Arts in New York City. She also trained in opera and jazz and performed in a gospel choir. Torres applied and was accepted to several colleges but could not afford to attend. She chose instead to pursue her dream of being a performer.

Career 
In 2001, Torres won the ALMA Award for Outstanding Lead Actress in a Syndicated Drama Series for her role in Cleopatra 2525.

In 2004, Torres was nominated for the International Press Academy's Golden Satellite Award for Best Performance by an Actress in a Supporting Role in a Series, Drama, for her role as Jasmine in Angel. Her film appearances have included The Matrix Reloaded (2003) and The Matrix Revolutions (2003).

In 2004, Torres appeared in seven episodes of the third season on 24 as Julia Milliken, a woman who has an affair with the White House Chief of Staff and becomes involved in a presidential scandal. In 2005, she was tapped for the pilot episode of Soccer Moms. Also in 2005, she voiced the character of Vixen in numerous episodes of the animated series Justice League Unlimited and replaced the voice-over of Jada Pinkett Smith's character Niobe in The Matrix Online. 
She is also known for her role in Fox's short-lived Firefly series, which lasted only one season. She reprised her Firefly role as Zoe in the film Serenity (2005). In 2006, Torres began her role as Cheryl Carrera in the short-lived drama series Standoff on the Fox network. Torres appeared in the film I Think I Love My Wife, playing the wife of Chris Rock's character.

She was cast in Washington Field, a 2009 CBS television pilot from executive Producer Edward Allen Bernero, about the National Capital Response Squad, a unit of the FBI made up of elite experts in different areas who travel around the world, responding to events that affect American interests.

She was the voice of Wonder Woman in DC Universe Online massively multiplayer online role-playing game until mid 2013 when the part was recast, as well as Airachnid in the Transformers Prime cartoon.

In 2013, Torres was reunited with fellow Firefly costar, Nathan Fillion, in an episode of Fillion's television show, Castle.

In 2011, Torres was cast as main character Jessica Pearson on the USA Network legal drama Suits. In 2016, it was announced that Torres would be leaving the cast of Suits following the summer segment of season six. In addition to her contract being up, Torres stated she had grown tired of traveling between Toronto, where Suits is filmed, and her home in Los Angeles. She joined the season two cast of ABC's The Catch, which was filmed in L.A. Torres returned to Suits for the season six finale, which aired on March 1, 2017. Following ABC's cancellation of The Catch in May 2017, Torres has returned to Suits as a recurring cast member in season seven.

Torres plays the role of CAPCOM in the updated version of Walt Disney World's Mission: Space.

In March 2018, it was announced Torres would executive produce and star in Pearson, a Suits spin-off centered on her character, Jessica Pearson.

It was announced on March 2, 2020, that Torres has been cast to portray Cleo Phillips in the drama pilot The Brides, which is written by Roberto Aguirre-Sacasa, but the series was not picked up by ABC.

On September 3, 2020, she was cast as Tommy Vega in the Fox drama series 9-1-1: Lone Star.

Personal life
Torres and Laurence Fishburne were engaged in February 2001, and married on September 22, 2002, at The Cloisters museum in New York City. They have a daughter together. Torres was also the stepmother to Fishburne's two children, from his previous marriage to actress Hajna O. Moss. Torres and Fishburne played a married couple on the show Hannibal.

In September 2017, Torres announced her separation from Fishburne. Fishburne filed for divorce on November 2, 2017, and the divorce was finalized effective May 11, 2018, after Torres and Fishburne reached a final settlement on April 16, 2018.

On January 1, 2020, Torres was a Grand Marshal of the 2020 Rose Parade.

Filmography

Film

Television

Video games

Theatre

Awards and nominations

References

External links 

 
 
 Gina Torres at the Internet Theatre Database
 

1969 births
Living people
20th-century American actresses
21st-century American actresses
Actresses from New Rochelle, New York
Actresses from New York City
American film actresses
American mezzo-sopranos
American people of Cuban descent
American stage actresses
American television actresses
American video game actresses
American voice actresses
Fiorello H. LaGuardia High School alumni
African-American actresses
Hispanic and Latino American actresses
People from the Bronx
People from Washington Heights, Manhattan
20th-century African-American women singers
21st-century African-American women
21st-century African-American people